Karuppu Panam is a 1964 Indian Tamil-language crime film directed and photographed by G. R. Nathan. The screenplay was written by Valampuri Somanathan from a story by Kannadasan. Music was by Viswanathan–Ramamoorthy. It stars T. S. Balaiah, K. Sarangapani, Balaji, K. R. Vijaya and Sheela. The film was commercially successful.

Plot

Cast 
Male cast
 T. S. Balaiah as Sattanathan
 K. Sarangapani as Dhamodharan
 Balaji as Gandhi
 Kuladeivam Rajagopal as Raju
 V. S. Raghavan as Sambasivam
 Shanmugasundaram as Sundaram
 Ramanathan as Devi's brother
 Kannadasan as Thanikachalam

Female cast
 K. R. Vijaya as Devi
 Sheela as Lucy
 C. K. Saraswathi as Shankari
 S. N. Lakshmi as Sattanathan's first wife
 S. Varalakshmi as Kamala

Production 
Karuppu Panam was directed and photographed by G. R. Nathan. The screenplay was written by Valampuri Somanathan from a story by Kannadasan. Editing was handled by S. Surya (for whom this was a posthumous release) and R. Devarajan, and art direction was handled by Alagappan.

Soundtrack 
The music was composed by Viswanathan–Ramamoorthy. Lyrics were written by Kannadasan.

Reception 
The Indian Express wrote, "As a photographer, G. R. Nathan's work is slick but as a director it is slack at many places [...] Kannadasan writes better than he acts".

References

External links 
 

1960s Tamil-language films
1964 crime films
1964 films
Fictional portrayals of the Tamil Nadu Police
Films about organised crime in India
Films scored by Viswanathan–Ramamoorthy
Films set in Chennai
Indian black-and-white films
Indian crime films